Tony Peak may refer to:

Merrill McPeak, Merrill Anthony "Tony" McPeak, former Chief of Staff of the United States Air Force
Tony McPeak (footballer), Scottish soccer player